Cryptogramma is a genus of ferns known commonly as rockbrakes or parsley ferns. They are one of the three genera in the Cryptogrammoideae subfamily of the Pteridaceae.  Cryptogramma ferns can be found in temperate regions on several continents worldwide. These ferns have two kinds of leaves which often look so different that at first glance they appear to belong to different plants. The fertile leaves have long, narrow, bumpy segments with undersides covered thickly in sporangia. The edges of the segments may curl back to cover the sporangia, forming a false indusium. The sterile leaves have thinner, wider segments which may be rounded and resemble the leaves of parsley. These ferns grow in rocky areas, often in crevices and cracks.

Distribution  
In North America, species within this genus are distributed over western and northern United States, Northwestern Mexico, and Canada.

Species 
Cryptogramma acrostichoides - American rockbrake
Cryptogramma cascadensis - Cascade rockbrake
Cryptogramma crispa - parsley fern
Cryptogramma sitchensis - Sitka rockbrake
Cryptogramma stelleri - fragile rockbrake, Steller's rockbrake, slender rockbrake

References

 Jepson Manual Treatment
 USDA Plants Profile
  genus description

Pteridaceae
Fern genera
Taxa named by Robert Brown (botanist, born 1773)